Post-amendment to the Tamil Nadu Entertainments Tax Act 1939 on 1 April 1958, Gross jumped to 140 per cent of Nett  Commercial Taxes Department disclosed 1.81 crore in entertainment tax revenue for the year.

The following is a list of films produced in the Tamil film industry in India in 1959, in alphabetical order.

1959

References 

Films, Tamil
Lists of 1959 films by country or language
1959
1950s Tamil-language films